Christopher Alan Broderick (born March 6, 1970) is an American musician, best known as a former guitarist of the heavy metal band Megadeth. He is also formerly the lead guitarist and keyboardist for Jag Panzer, appearing on four of Jag Panzer's albums The Age of Mastery, Thane to the Throne (a concept album about Shakespeare's Macbeth), Mechanized Warfare and Casting the Stones before moving on to Megadeth, replacing Glen Drover. Before joining Megadeth and while still in Jag Panzer, he was also a touring guitarist for Nevermore between 2001 and 2003 and then again between 2006 and 2007. He is now the lead guitarist for Act of Defiance, which he formed with fellow ex-Megadeth bandmate Shawn Drover, and also joined In Flames in 2019, as touring guitarist, before becoming the permanent rhythm guitarist in 2022.

Biography

Early years 

Broderick started playing guitar when he was 11 years old. His playing styles range from metal, classical, neoclassical, and jazz. Broderick has been said to have practiced 14 hours a day during his summers as a teen.

He practiced electric guitar, classical guitar, piano, and violin under a strict daily routine. He has said that at that time it seemed more like a "chore" than for entertainment. He was a standout player in the Denver music scene from 1988 on in bands Grey Haven, Industrial Eden (guitarist/lead vocalist) and Killing Time.

He also has a degree in classical guitar music performance at the University of Denver's Lamont School of Music. He is also interested in flamenco guitar and rates Paco de Lucia as his favourite guitarist.

Jag Panzer (1997–2008) 
In 1997, guitarist Joey Tafolla left Jag Panzer for the second time, citing a lack of interest in playing heavy metal. For the band, this was a huge problem. Tafolla's guitar work was complex and technical, and as far as they knew few guitarists could comprehend it. This is when Broderick was brought into the fold of Jag Panzer and stayed with them for almost a decade.  He played on four of the band's albums. 1998's The Age of Mastery, 2000's Thane to the Throne (a concept album about William Shakespeare's play Macbeth), 2001's Mechanized Warfare, 2003's compilation album Decade of the Nail Spiked Bat and 2004's Casting the Stones.

Nevermore (2001–2003, 2006–2007) 
During the time period of 2000–2003 and some of 2004, Broderick was taking part in the live shows of heavy metal band Nevermore. After the release of the album, This Godless Endeavor, he began once again to tour with Nevermore until joining Megadeth in 2008.

Megadeth (2008–2014) 

In late 2007, rumors had been circulating that Megadeth guitarist Glen Drover had left the band. This was proved to be true after statements released from both Glen and Megadeth frontman Dave Mustaine. The night after the statements were released, Megadeth drummer Shawn Drover brought up Broderick as a possible replacement. Shawn then showed Mustaine a video of Broderick playing both classical and electric guitar. Mustaine was immediately won over and soon managed to get in contact with Broderick. Two weeks later, Broderick was officially declared the new guitarist for Megadeth. He made his live debut with the band on February 4, 2008, in Finland and toured with them on Gigantour 2008. He went on to record guitar parts for their twelfth album, Endgame (2009), through to their fourteenth album, Super Collider (2013).

Due to extensive touring with Megadeth, Broderick was no longer be able to collaborate with Jag Panzer and Nevermore. Mustaine said that when he partnered up with Broderick, he said that it reminded him of when "Ozzy Osbourne met Randy Rhoads". On March 8, 2009, Mustaine commented that he thought Broderick was the greatest guitarist Megadeth had ever had. In the then-current line up of the band, he was the youngest member in Megadeth. During his time with Megadeth, Broderick had to stop playing his trademark seven-string guitar and adopt a six-string guitar. Broderick said that "Dave [Mustaine] felt a seven-string guitar wasn't an original thrash metal instrument. Therefore he felt it would be better if I used six strings." He said in an interview with Total Guitar that he would stay with Megadeth as long as they were happy to have him.

On November 25, 2014, Broderick posted a message on his website saying he was parting ways with Megadeth: "Due to artistic and musical differences, it is with great reluctance that I announce my departure from Megadeth to pursue my own musical direction. I want all of you to know how much I appreciate the amount that you the fans have accepted and respected me as a member of Megadeth for the last seven years, but it is time for me to move on. I wish Dave and everyone in Megadeth all the best. I am working on a few things of my own and hope that when they come out, you will all dig it."

Act of Defiance (2014–present) 
After leaving Megadeth, Broderick and former Megadeth drummer Shawn Drover formed Act of Defiance along with ex-Scar the Martyr frontman Henry Derek Bonner and former Shadows Fall guitarist Matt Bachand.

Equipment 
Broderick was endorsed by Ibanez guitars and DiMarzio Pickups (A Pair of D Activator 7's neck and bridge models) along with ENGL amplifiers and Ernie Ball Slinky strings. Before using Ibanez Guitars, he used Schecter Guitars with Seymour Duncan pickups. In the past he has also used Bare Knuckle Pickups, mainly the coldsweat models.

Despite an ENGL endorsement, he used Marshall Amps (the JVM 410 and EL34 100/100 power amp) during his time in Megadeth at Mustaine's demand. During his time in Megadeth he switched (along with Mustaine) to using a Fractal Axe-FX II rig modeler which he continues to use.

In January 2011, Broderick left Ibanez and is now endorsing Jackson Guitars. He is playing a custom shop archtop soloist produced to his personal demands, featuring 24 frets, 12" radius, custom DiMarzio pickups (tentatively called the Fundamental) and is available in a 6 or 7 string configuration. Broderick uses Dunlop Tortex T3 picks in 1.35mm. He uses a pick holder that keeps the pick in place on his thumb, which he has manufactured and sells on his website.

Bands 
 Jag Panzer 1997–2008
 Nevermore 2001–2003, 2006–2007 (live member only)
 Megadeth 2008–2014
 Act of Defiance 2014–present
 In Flames 2022–present (touring member 2019–2022)

Discography

Jag Panzer 
 The Age of Mastery (1998)
 Thane to the Throne (2000)
 Mechanized Warfare (2001)
 The Era of Kings and Conflict (2002)
 Decade of the Nail Spiked Bat (2003)
 Casting the Stones (2004)

Megadeth 
 Blood in the Water: Live in San Diego (2008) (unreleased)
 Endgame (2009)
 Rust in Peace Live (2010)
 The Big 4 Live from Sofia, Bulgaria (2010)
 Thirteen (2011)
 Super Collider (2013)
 Countdown to Extinction: Live (2013)

Nevermore 
 The Year of the Voyager (2008)

Act of Defiance
 Birth and the Burial (2015)
 Old Scars, New Wounds (2017)

In Flames
 Foregone (2023)

References

External links 

 
 
 
 Skill Showcase

1970 births
20th-century American guitarists
21st-century American guitarists
American heavy metal guitarists
American male guitarists
Megadeth members
In Flames members
Lead guitarists
Living people
Seven-string guitarists
University of Denver alumni